Eye to Eye with Willie Jackson, or more simply Eye to Eye, was a New Zealand current affairs programme on TV One which looks at the main events from a Māori point of view.

Willie Jackson, or back up presenter Claudette Hauiti, had both an interviewee and panellists; both were usually prominent Māori people.

The show was discontinued in 2009 by TVNZ amid funding changes.

References

External links
 Eye to Eye
 About Eye to Eye
 Willie Jackson

2000s New Zealand television series
2004 New Zealand television series debuts
2009 New Zealand television series endings
New Zealand television news shows
TVNZ 1 original programming